Abagaitu Islet (Bolshoy Ostrov) is an islet in the Argun River (Asia) divided between the People's Republic of China (Inner Mongolia Autonomous Region) and Russia (Chita Oblast).

The island was occupied by the Soviet Union in 1929, a move not accepted by China, resulting in a border dispute that lasted more than seventy years.

On October 14, 2004, the Complementary Agreement between the People's Republic of China and the Russian Federation on the Eastern Section of the China–Russia Boundary was signed, in which Russia agreed to relinquish control over a part of Abagaitu Islet. In 2005, the Russian Duma and the Chinese National People's Congress approved the agreement.

See also 
 Bolshoy Ussuriysky Island

References 
 Russian map

River islands of China
Landforms of Inner Mongolia
River islands of Russia
International islands
Bodies of water of Zabaykalsky Krai
China–Russia border